Bărcăneşti may refer to several places in Romania:

Bărcănești, Ialomița, a commune in Ialomiţa County
Bărcănești, Prahova, a commune in Prahova County
Bărcăneşti, a village in Cândeşti Commune, Neamţ County
Bărcăneşti, a village in Vâlcele Commune, Olt County
Bărcăneşti, a village in Stăneşti Commune, Vâlcea County